Hot isostatic pressing (HIP) is a manufacturing process, used to reduce the porosity of metals and increase the density of many ceramic materials. This improves the material's mechanical properties and workability. 

The process can be used to produce waste form classes. Calcined radioactive waste (waste with additives) is packed into a thin walled metal canister. The adsorbed gases are removed with high heat and the remaining material compressed to full density using argon gas during the heat cycle. This process can shrink steel canisters to minimize space in disposal containers and during transport. It was invented in the 1950s at the Battelle Memorial Institute and has been used to prepare nuclear fuel for submarines since the 1960s. It is used to prepare inactive ceramics as well, and the Idaho National Laboratory has validated it for the consolidation of radioactive ceramic waste forms. ANSTO (Australian Nuclear Science and Technology Organisation) is using HIP as part of a process to immobilize waste radionuclides from molybdenum-99 production. 

The HIP process subjects a component to both elevated temperature and isostatic gas pressure in a high pressure containment vessel. The pressurizing gas most widely used is argon. An inert gas is used so that the material does not chemically react. The choice of metal can minimize negative effects of chemical reactions. Nickel, stainless or mild steel, or other metals can be chosen depending on the desired redox conditions. The chamber is heated, causing the pressure inside the vessel to increase. Many systems use associated gas pumping to achieve the necessary pressure level. Pressure is applied to the material from all directions (hence the term "isostatic").

When castings are treated with HIP, the simultaneous application of heat and pressure eliminates internal voids and microporosity through a combination of plastic deformation, creep, and diffusion bonding; this process improves fatigue resistance of the component. Primary applications are the reduction of microshrinkage, the consolidation of powder metals, ceramic composites and metal cladding. Hot isostatic pressing is thus also used as part of a sintering (powder metallurgy) process and for fabrication of metal matrix composites,
often being used for postprocessing in additive manufacturing.

References

External links
  EPMA HIP info page

Industrial processes
Metallurgical processes
Metalworking